Lillesands Tidende was a Norwegian newspaper, published in Lillesand in Aust-Agder county.

Lillesands Tidende was started in 1886 as Lillesands Tilskuer. Its name was changed in 1918. It went defunct in 1921.

References

1886 establishments in Norway
1921 disestablishments in Norway
Mass media in Aust-Agder
Defunct newspapers published in Norway
Lillesand
Newspapers published in Norway
Norwegian-language newspapers
Publications established in 1886
Publications disestablished in 1921